Jamshid Boltaboev (born 3 October 1996) is an Uzbek professional footballer playing for Sogdiana Jizzakh and the Uzbek national team. A versatile defensive utility player, he can operate in positions including: centre-back, right-back, and defensive midfielder.

Youth career

Not long after the 2012 AFC U-16 Championship, he impressed foreign European scouts so much as that several clubs sent trial proposals but he chose AS Monaco FC and took part in a six-day training with the As Monaco Academy and participated in a friendly match.

International

During his first game for the Uzbekistan national under-23 football team countering Asian giants South Korea U-23, he got a red card by inflicting a rash tackle in the 72nd minute, missing the match against Iraq U23.

In 2013, the former U-17 international was named the Best Young Player of the Year along with compatriots Akobir Turaev and Izzatilla Abdullayev.

Achievements

 2x Uzbek League winner
 2x Uzbekistan Super Cup runners-up
 1x Best Young Player of the Year award

Domestic club statistics

International goals

References

External links
 

Uzbekistani footballers
Uzbekistan international footballers
Association football defenders
Living people
1996 births
Place of birth missing (living people)